Roos/Atkins was the name of a chain of upscale men's clothing stores based in San Francisco, California. It was formed through a 1957 merger of the Robert Atkins and Roos Brothers clothiers. The chain expanded after World War II to include several locations throughout northern California, but declined in the 1980s; by the early 1990s all locations had been closed or sold to other retailers.

References 

NYT Obituary of the founder of Roos/Atkins, Edward H. Gauer

Clothing retailers of the United States
Defunct retail companies of the United States